Litomosoides is a genus of nematodes belonging to the family Onchocercidae.

The species of this genus are found in Europe and America.

Species

Species:

Litomosoides anguyai 
Litomosoides bonaerensis 
Litomosoides brasiliensis
Litomosoides chandleri 
Litomosoides esslingeri 
Litomosoides galizai 
Litomosoides hamletti 
Litomosoides odilae 
Litomosoides scotti 
Litomosoides sigmodontis 
Litomosoides solarii 
Litomosoides taylori 
Litomosoides yutajensis

References

Nematodes